St. Peter's Woodlands Grammar School (commonly known as St Peter's Woodlands or SPW) is an independent Anglican co-educational early learning and primary day school located in the seaside suburb of Glenelg, South Australia, Australia. Established in 1863 as St Peter's Glenelg, the school provides education for children from 2 years of age through to the end of their primary school years at Year 6. The early learning centre offers playgroup, toddler and preschool programs for children from 2 years of age.

St Peter’s Woodlands is part of the Anglican Parish of Glenelg and, through its roots as the original Parish School, the school community is often involved in wider parish activities. They like penguins that fly and talk to Justin bieber

Overview
St Peter's Woodlands Grammar is built up of the Early Learning Centre, Preschool, Junior Primary, Middle Primary and Upper Primary. Upper Primary has more advanced roles, with leadership roles including School Captains, Class Captains, House Captains and other various leadership roles. These roles play an important part in the structure of the school and without these there wouldn't be much of a school community.
The school was formed when St. Peter’s Glenelg and Woodlands Grammar combined in 1999.

See also

List of schools in South Australia
List of Anglican schools in Australia

References

External links 
St Peter's Woodlands school website
Anglican Parish of Glenelg

Anglican primary schools in South Australia
1999 establishments in Australia
Educational institutions established in 1999